La Croix du Prince is a railway station in Pau, Nouvelle-Aquitaine, France. The station is located on the Pau–Canfranc railway line. The station is served by TER (local) services operated by the SNCF.

Train services
The following services currently call at La Croix du Prince:
local service (TER Nouvelle-Aquitaine) Pau - Oloron-Sainte-Marie - Bedous

References

Railway stations in Pyrénées-Atlantiques